Ivaylo Sharankov (18 November 1933 – 16 May 2016) was a Bulgarian long-distance runner. He competed in the marathon at the 1968 Summer Olympics.

References

1933 births
2016 deaths
Athletes (track and field) at the 1968 Summer Olympics
Bulgarian male long-distance runners
Bulgarian male marathon runners
Olympic athletes of Bulgaria
People from Pernik